Pattison, also known as Martin, is a census-designated place and unincorporated community in Claiborne County, Mississippi, United States. Its ZIP code is 39144.

It was first named as a CDP in the 2020 Census which listed a population of 176.

History
Pattison was originally named Martin in honor of General William T. Martin. Pattison is located on the former Yazoo and Mississippi Valley Railroad and was once home to a drug store, grist mill, cotton gin, saloon, hotel, and multiple general stores.

A post office operated under the name Martin from 1879 to 1912 and first began operation under the name Pattison in 1912.

Demographics

2020 census

Note: the US Census treats Hispanic/Latino as an ethnic category. This table excludes Latinos from the racial categories and assigns them to a separate category. Hispanics/Latinos can be of any race.

Education
Residents are zoned to the Claiborne County School District. Port Gibson High School is the comprehensive high school of the district.

Notable person
 Bennie Goods, former Canadian Football League defensive tackle, was born in Pattison.

Notes

Unincorporated communities in Claiborne County, Mississippi
Unincorporated communities in Mississippi
Census-designated places in Claiborne County, Mississippi